Johnny B. Truant is an American multi-genre writer specializing in science fiction and fantasy stories.

Life and career 

Johnny B. Truant is co-owner of Sterling & Stone, a multimedia story studio focusing on books and adaptations for film and television, along with Sean Platt and David W. Wright.

Personal life 

Originally from Ohio, Truant and his family live in Austin, Texas.

Works

Novels 

Fat Vampire Chronicles series:
 Fat Vampire series:
 Fat Vampire (2012), 
 Fat Vampire 2: Tastes Like Chicken (2012), 
 Fat Vampire 3: All You Can Eat (2012), 
 Fat Vampire 4: Harder Better Fatter Stronger (2013), 
 Fat Vampire 5: Fatpocalypse (2013), 
 Fat Vampire 6: Survival of the Fattest (2013), 
 Game of Fangs (2020), 
 The Vampire Maurice series:
 The Vampire Maurice (2019), 
 Anarchy and Blood (2019), 
 Vampires in the White City (2019), 
 Fangs and Fame (2022), 

Unicorn Western series, with Sean Platt:
 Unicorn Western (2012), novella, 
 Unicorn Western 2, or The Wanderers (2013), novella, 
 Unicorn Western 3, or A Fistful Of Magic (2013), novella, 
 Unicorn Western 4, or Shimmer To Yuma (2013), novella, 
 Unicorn Western 5, or The Man Who Shot Alan Whitney (2013), novella, 
 Unicorn Western 6, or The Spectacular Seven (2013), novella, 
 Unicorn Western 7, or Open Meadows (2013), novella, 
 Unicorn Western 8, or The Unforgotten (2013), novella, 
 Unicorn Western 9, or The Magic Bunch (2013), novella, 
 Prequels:
 Unicorn Genesis, or Unicorn Genesis: Origins (2013), 
 Unicorn Western: The Outlaw Hassle Stone (2013), 

The Beam universe:
 Plugged: How Hyperconnectivity and The Beam Changed How We Think (2013), with Sterling Gibson and Sean Platt, 
 The Beam series, with Sean Platt:
 The Beam: Season One, or The Beam: The First Season (2013), 
 The Beam: Season Two, or The Beam: The Complete Second Season (2014), 
 The Beam: Season Three (2015), 
 Future Proof (coming soon)

The Inevitable universe:
 The Inevitable series, with Sean Platt:
 Robot Proletariat, or Robot Proletariat: Season One (2013), 
 The Infinite Loop (2018), 
 The Hard Reset (2018), 
 Cascade Failure (2020), 
 Reboot (2020), 
 En3my (2021), 

The Dream Engine series, with Sean Platt:
 The Dream Engine (2014), 
 The Nightmare Factory (2015), 
 The Ruby Room (2016), 
 The Tinkerer's Mainspring (2021), 

Invasion universe, with Sean Platt:
 Alien Invasion series:
 Invasion (2015), 
 Contact (2015), 
 Colonization (2015), 
 Annihilation (2015), 
 Judgment (2016), 
 Extinction (2016), 
 Resurrection (2016), 
 Longshot (2020), 
 Save the Humans series:
 Save the City (2019), 
 Save the Girl (2019), 
 Save the World (2019), 
 Conundrum (2019), novella, 

Dead World series, with Sean Platt:
 Dead City (2016), 
 Dead Nation (2020), 
 Dead Planet (2020), 
 Dead Zero (2020), 
 "Empty Nest" (2021), short story, 

The Tomorrow Gene series, with Sean Platt:
 The Tomorrow Gene (2017), 
 The Eden Experiment (2017), 
 The Tomorrow Clone (2017), 
 Null Identity (2021), 

Part of the Version Control series:
 4. Screenplay (2020), with Sean Platt, 
 Sick and Wired (2020), with Avery Blake, novella, 

Stand-alones:
 The Bialy Pimps (2012), 
 Everyone Gets Divorced, or Everyone Gets Divorced: Episode 1 (2013), with Sean Platt, 
 Greens, or Greens: Episode 1 (2013), with Sean Platt, 
 Namaste, or Vengeance (2013), with Sean Platt, 
 Space Shuttle: Season One (2013), with Sean Platt, 
 Axis of Aaron (2014), with Sean Platt, 
 Terms of Service (2014), with Sean Platt, novella
 Cursed: The Box Set, or Cursed: The Full Saga (2015), with Sean Platt, 
 Devil May Care (2016), with Sean Platt, 
 La Fleur de Blanc (2017), with Sean Platt, 
 Pretty Killer (2019), with Nolon King, 
 The Future of Sex (2019), with Sean Platt, 
 Pattern Black (2022), with Sean Platt, 
 The Target (2022), with Nolon King, 
 Burnout (2022), with Sean Platt, 
 The Island (2023), with Sean Platt,

Short stories 

Collections:
 Infinite Pieces (2017), with Sean Platt, collection of 3 short stories, 1 novella and 1 novel:
 "Decoy Wallet", "Infinite Doors", "Caveman Timecop", Unicorn Western (novella; Unicorn Western series #1), Fat Vampire (novel; Fat Vampire series #1)

Non-fiction 

Helf-help
 Choose to be outstanding or choose to continue to suck (2010)
 Epic series:
 Disobey (2011), 
 How to Live Forever (2012), 
 The Universe Doesn't Give a Flying Fuck About You (2012), 
 You Are Dying, and Your World Is a Lie (2012), 
 How To Be Legendary (2012)
 The Story Solution (2019), with Sean Platt, 

Writing
 Write. Publish. Repeat. (2013), with Sean Platt and David W. Wright, 
 Fiction Unboxed: How Two Authors Wrote and Published a Book in 30 Days, From Scratch, In Front of the World (2014), with Sean Platt, 
 Iterate And Optimize: Optimize Your Creative Business for Profit (2016), with Sean Platt and David W. Wright, 
 The One With All the Writing Advice (2016), with Sean Platt,

Adaptations 

 Reginald the Vampire (2022), series created by Harley Peyton, based on series of novels Fat Vampire

References

External links 

 
 Johnny B. Truant at Sterling & Stone
 Johnny B. Truant at BookBub
 
 

Living people
21st-century American novelists
American male novelists
21st-century American male writers
Year of birth missing (living people)